The Narayan barb (Pethia narayani), is a species of cyprinid fish endemic to India where it is found in clear hill streams in the Western Ghats.  This species can reach a length of  TL.  It is also found in the aquarium trade.

References 

Pethia
Barbs (fish)
Fish described in 1937